Thorius arboreus, commonly known as the arboreal minute salamander, is a species of salamander in the family Plethodontidae. It is endemic to Sierra de Juarez, Oaxaca, Mexico. The specific name arboreus, derives from the Latin word arbor, meaning tree, referring to the arboreal habitat of this species.

Description
It has a slender habitus. The head is relatively wide; the snout is bluntly pointed. The eyes are relatively large. Maxillary teeth are lacking. The limbs are relatively long. There is a reddish dorsal stripe; some individuals have an ornate pattern where the dorsolateral margins of the stripe are "pinched" over the shoulders.

Habitat and conservation
Its natural habitat is cloud forest. It is an arboreal species typically occurring in the leaf axils of bromeliads. It tolerates some habitat degradation provided that shade remains. Main threats to it are encroachment of agriculture and logging.

References

arboreus
Fauna of the Sierra Madre de Oaxaca
Endemic amphibians of Mexico
Taxonomy articles created by Polbot
Amphibians described in 1994